Bolsa Chica State Beach is a public ocean beach in Orange County, California, United States. It is located north of Huntington Beach and south of the community of Sunset Beach. The beach extends  from Warner Avenue in Sunset Beach south to Seapoint Avenue, where the Huntington City Beach begins. The Bolsa Chica Ecological Reserve is located across the busy Pacific Coast Highway (PCH) from the beach and is a popular spot for birdwatching. The Bolsa Chica bicycle path runs along the length of the park through Huntington City Beach.

Activities include surfing, sunbathing, and water sports. Tent camping is not allowed at Bolsa Chica State Beach. Fire rings are available. 

Surf fishing for perch, corbina, California corbina, croaker, cabezon, shovelnose guitar fish and sand shark is available. California grunion is a species that only spawns on sandy southern California beaches. Under state law, these fish may be caught by hand with a fishing permit. Wildlife and bird watching are also popular at this state beach.  

Lifeguards from the California State Parks Lifeguard Service patrol the beach year-round and lifeguard towers are staffed during the summer.

History
The area that is now Bolsa Chica State Beach was once called "Tin Can Beach" by locals.  The  property was added to the state park system in 1960.

In 1967, a nuclear power and desalination plant was planned on Bolsa Island, a man-made island off the beach. It was supposed to produce more electricity than the Hoover Dam. However, the plans were abandoned by its chairman Jack K. Horton in 1968, as Southern California Edison was unable to raise sufficient capital, despite rate hikes and the sale of common stocks.

See also
 Bolsa Chica Basin State Marine Conservation Area
List of beaches in California
List of California state parks
List of California State Beaches

References

1960 establishments in California
Beaches of Southern California
Bike paths in Los Angeles
California State Beaches
Campgrounds in California
Geography of Huntington Beach, California
Parks in Orange County, California
Protected areas established in 1960
Surfing locations in California
Beaches of Orange County, California